The 1984 England rugby union tour of South Africa was a series of seven matches played by the England national rugby union team in South Africa in May and June 1984. England played seven games, including two test matches against the South Africa national rugby union team. They won four of the seven matches but lost both of the test matches as well as drawing the fixture against Western Province.

In the face of much criticism, and in spite of covert political pressure, the Rugby Football Union decided that the tour of South Africa should go ahead, but probably with hindsight, in the light of results, later wished that they had not. The RFU Council voted in favour of the tour proceeding by 44 votes to 6. Although only Ralph Knibbs of Bristol made opposition to apartheid his reason, many other top players were also unable to tour, and the squad was relatively inexperienced. 10 of the 26 players were uncapped before the tour and 7 gained their first caps in South Africa.

Matches
Scores and results list England's points tally first.

Test matches

First test

Second test

Touring party
Tour manager : Ron Jacobs
Team manager: Derek Morgan
Coach: Dick Greenwood
Captain: John Scott (Cardiff) 31 caps

Backs

Dusty Hare (Leicester) 23 caps
Nick Stringer (Wasps) 2 caps
Mark Bailey (Cambridge University) No caps
Steve Burnhill (Loughborough Coll) No caps
Paul Dodge (Leicester) 25 caps
John Palmer (Bath) No caps
Tony Swift (Swansea) 5 caps
David Trick (Bath) 1 cap
Huw Davies (Wasps) 12 caps
Richard Hill (Bath) No caps
John Horton (Bath) 11 caps
Nick Youngs (Leicester) 6 caps
Bryan Barley (Wakefield) 3 caps

Forwards

Phil Blakeway (Gloucester) 14 caps
Steve Brain (Coventry) No caps
Chris Butcher (Harlequins) No caps
David Cusani (Orrell) No caps
John Fidler (Gloucester) 2 caps
Jon Hall (Bath) 3 caps
Steve Mills (Gloucester) 3 caps
Gary Pearce (Northampton) 14 caps
Malcolm Preedy (Gloucester) No caps
Paul Rendall (Wasps) 1 cap
Gary Rees (Nottingham) No caps
John Scott (Cardiff) 31 caps
Mike Teague (Gloucester) No caps
Peter Winterbottom (Headingley) 13 caps

See also
History of rugby union matches between England and South Africa

References

1984 rugby union tours
1984
Rugby union and apartheid
1983–84 in English rugby union
1984 in South African rugby union
Sports scandals in England